The 1997–98 FAW Premier Cup group stage matches took place between September and December 1997.

Groups

Group A

Group B

See also
 1997–98 in Welsh football

References

External links
Unofficial Principality Welsh Premier League website
Official Principality Welsh Premier League website

FAW Premier Cup
1997–98 in Welsh football cups